Bovera is a village in Catalonia in Spain. The village is in the comarca (county) of les Garrigues in the region of Lleida. Bovera is close to the town of Flix. The usually dry River Cana valley leads to the Ebre river at Flix.

In early November 2015 there was unusual rain that caused local flooding that was reported as particularly severe compared with other areas. Damage to 20 or 30% of crops such as olives over more than 1000 hectares was estimated.

Demography 
The population of Bovera in 2014 was 290.

References

External links

 Government data pages 

Municipalities in Garrigues (comarca)
Populated places in Garrigues (comarca)